Baćina is a village in the Ploče municipality, Dubrovnik-Neretva County in Croatia.

References

External links

Populated places in Dubrovnik-Neretva County